Q&A was a database and word processing software program for IBM PCcompatible computers published by Symantec and partners from 1985 to 1998.  It was written by a team headed by Symantec founder Dr. Gary Hendrix, Denis Coleman, and Gordon Eubanks.

Released by Symantec in 1985 for MS-DOS computers, Q&A's flat-file database and integrated word processing application is cited as a significant step towards making computers less intimidating and more user friendly.  Among its features was a natural language search function based on a 600-word internal vocabulary.

Product evolution 
Q&A Software was originally a natural language research project, involving a group of former SRI International researchers led by Dr. Earl Sacerdoti and Dr. Gary Hendrix, funded first by the National Science Foundation Small Business Innovation Research Program, and later by venture capital investors including Kleiner Perkins, Q&A evolved into both a useful business productivity tool and the foundation of Symantec. The now-famous professional poker player Barry Greenstein worked on the Q&A word processor during his employment at Symantec.

Dr. Hendrix mused that only time would tell whether Q&A's integrated natural language ability would be merely a passing fad or perceived as a valuable feature.

The product gained popularity and generated nearly $1.4 million in 1985.

By the end of fiscal 1989, after Version 3's release, Q&A accounted for nearly a third of Symantec's $50 million revenues, occupying the top spot in the flat-file database market in 1991.

Version 1.0 and 1.1 

Version 1.0 came out in November 1985. It was designed to look and work like pfs:File and pfs:Write. It had the natural language capability to answer English questions about the database.

Version 2.0 
Version 2 came out in late 1986. It included a "Recover" function to make damaged databases usable again and expanded capabilities to import data from dBase II and III and Lotus 1-2-3. The software had been prepared for internationalization, and a German version (called F&A (in German)) came out followed by release in several other languages.

Version 3.0 
Version 3.0 was released in the spring of 1988. Users of this version could simultaneously use a database on a local area network.  Data records were locked so that users could be editing different records at the same time.  If user A were editing a record it was locked from other users who would see a message saying user A was editing it and would not be able to edit it themselves.  Stored reports and other specifications could be edited at the same time also with the same mechanism. Reports could be run and even if they ran slowly their results would be drawn from a consistent set of data as it appeared at the time the report began to execute, rather than include edits made during the time the report ran.  This multiuser functionality was described by Symantec as new to the low-end PC database market.

With a function called XLOOKUP, Q&A 3.0 could be programmed to bring values from an external database into the currently open one—a step toward relational database functionality.

Version 4 for DOS and for Windows 

Released for Windows in 1993, Version 4.0 boasted a plethora of new features, including both Form View and Spreadsheet View, the ability to choose file names from a dialog box, and a simple control panel (favorably compared to the controls of a VCR).

Symantec attempted to develop a Macintosh version of Q&A at the same time as their Windows effort. This occurred at their Monterey Development Center. It would have been a functional equivalent with a Macintosh flavour. Sadly, they were unable to complete the project and it was scrapped.

Perhaps more anticipated was an improvement on Q&A's original natural language technology which appeared in the Windows version. Called DAVE—Do Anything Very Easily—in 4.0, the natural language query feature was possessed of two aspects: Intelligent Assistant, which allowed users to navigate easily amongst records using basic English queries created by clicking entries in the toolbar, and Scripting Assistant, which permitted the creation of scripts within the application to automate commonly used, repetitive tasks, as opposed to the keystroke recorded macros used by the DOS version.

Version 4.0 included a fully functional word processor—Q&A Write—that could be launched from Q&A or used as a stand-alone application. Q&A Write featured a 100,000 word spell check, a 660,000 word thesaurus, a dictionary, formatting options such as page layout, columnar formatting, automatic page numbering and headers, as well as support for the addition of graphics. Additionally, it offered multifont printing support and the ability to hot-link elements of a Lotus 1-2-3 document, Symphony spreadsheet or Lotus PIC graphs, to Q&A Write documents. Macros could be stored in an ASCII text file created with a text editor, Q&A Write or by recording keys; the Macro Menu could be accessed from many locations by pressing Shift-F2.

In keeping with previous versions, Q&A 4.0 was fully backward compatible, allowing users to easily access data created in prior versions of the software.  4.0 is largely considered “classic” Q&A.

The (customer) contact management software ACT!, another earlier Symantec product now being continued by the SAGE group, also had the ability to read Q&A datafiles.

Last Years 
In 1994, Symantec announced that it would no longer continue to develop Q&A.  Amid public outcry, particularly from the Q&A User Group, Symantec was forced to reconsider and commissioned PFP Software GmbH of Düsseldorf to develop an upgrade to the DOS version.   Released in 1995 first only in Europe, then later in the US in response to demands from the extremely vocal user base, Andreas Göbel's  Version 5.0 addressed interoperability issues, added more user control over form colors and introduced the ability to Copy/Paste between fields.

Although Symantec continued to sell both Versions 4.0 and 5.0, neither was actively marketed, and in September, 1998, all sales and support of Q&A were halted.

Alternative application
Shortly before the cessation of Q&A sales, a joint venture between Professional Computer Technology Associates (PCTA) and Marble Publications led by longtime Q&A users William Halpern and Tom Marcellus began negotiating with Symantec to address the issues facing long-term Q&A users.  By the time Q&A sales and support had been halted, Symantec was actively referring users with questions to the venture—sales inquiries to PCTA, support inquiries to both PCTA and Marble Publications.

Recognizing that Q&A would lapse into obsolescence as advances in hardware and software moved forward, Halpern and a group of Q&A "power users" began meeting in 1999 to address the possibility of developing a new product—compatible with Q&A databases—to allow users to migrate seamlessly without losing their important data.  In 2000, Halpern's group became Lantica Software, LLC, which released its first version of Sesame Database Manager in 2003.

Reception

Noted SF author, Chaos Manor creator and Byte magazine columnist Jerry Pournelle wrote fondly of Q&A; Write, claiming it as his sole word processor.

See also
 Comparison of office suites

References

External links 
Lantica Software (Sesame Database Manager)
The Worldwide Q&A User Group Web Site
Q&A Files and Information – compiled by the Worldwide Q&A User Group
Professional Computer Technology Associates
The Quick Answer
John T. Dow - Q&A Information
The Quick Answer Back Issue Library
Inside Sesame - The Sesame Newsletter
Sesame Associates of New England Users' Group

Office suites
Gen Digital software
Computer-related introductions in 1985
DOS software